This list catalogs notable University of Massachusetts Amherst faculty.

University of Massachusetts Amherst
 
University of Massachusetts Amherst faculty